Robert Recorde was an Anglo-Welsh physician and mathematician. He invented the equals sign (=) and also introduced the pre-existing plus (+) and minus (−) signs to English speakers in 1557.

Biography
Born around 1512, Robert Recorde was the second and last son of Thomas and Rose Recorde of Tenby, Pembrokeshire, in Wales.

Recorde entered the University of Oxford about 1525, and was elected a Fellow of All Souls College there in 1531.  Having adopted medicine as a profession, he went to the University of Cambridge to take the degree of M.D. in 1545.  He afterwards returned to Oxford, where he publicly taught mathematics, as he had done prior to going to Cambridge. He invented the "equals" sign, which consists of two horizontal parallel lines, stating that no two things can be more equal.  It appears that he afterwards went to London, and acted as physician to King Edward VI and to Queen Mary, to whom some of his books are dedicated.  He was also controller of the Royal Mint and served as Comptroller of Mines and Monies in Ireland.  After being sued for defamation by a political enemy, he was arrested for debt and died in the King's Bench Prison, Southwark, by the middle of June 1558.

Publications

Recorde published several works upon mathematical and medical subjects, chiefly in the form of dialogue between master and scholar, such as the following:
The Grounde of Artes, teachings the Worke and Practise, of Arithmeticke, both in whole numbers and fractions (1543), the first English language book on algebra.
The Pathway to Knowledge, containing the First Principles of Geometry ... bothe for the use of Instrumentes Geometricall and Astronomicall, and also for Projection of Plattes (London, 1551)
The Castle of Knowledge, containing the Explication of the Sphere both Celestiall and Materiall, etc. (London, 1556) A book explaining Ptolemaic astronomy while mentioning the Copernican heliocentric model in passing.
The Whetstone of Witte, whiche is the seconde parte of Arithmeteke: containing the extraction of rootes; the cossike practise, with the rule of equation; and the workes of Surde Nombers (London, 1557). This was the book in which the equals sign was introduced within a printed edition. With the publication of this book Recorde is credited with introducing algebra into the Island of Britain with a systematic notation.
 A medical work, The Urinal of Physick (1548), frequently reprinted.<ref>[https://books.google.com/books?id=Sax491XagIgC The Urinal of Physick], by Robert Recorde, 1548; at Google Books</ref>
Most of those works were written in the form of a catechism.
Several books whose authors are unknown have been attributed to him: Cosmographiae isagoge, De Arte faciendi Horologium and De Usu Globorum et de Statu temporum.

See also
 Equality
 Equals sign
 Equation
 History of mathematical notation
 St. Mary's Church, Tenby
 The Ground of Arts Welsh mathematicians
 Zenzizenzizenzic – a word to describe a number to the eighth power coined by Robert Recorde

Notes

References
 
 James R. Newman (1956). The World of Mathematics Vol. 1 Commentary on Robert Recorde Philip E. B. Jourdain (1913). The Nature of Mathematics Gareth Roberts and Fenny Smith, editors (2012).  Robert Recorde: The Life and Times of a Tudor Mathematician (University of Wales Press, distributed by University of Chicago Press) 232 pages
 Jack Williams (2011). Robert Recorde: Tudor Polymath, Expositor and Practitioner of Computation (Heidelberg, Springer) (History of Computing).
 J. W. S. Cassels (1976). Is This a Recorde?, The Mathematical Gazette Vol. 60 No. 411 March 1976 p 59-61
 Gordon Roberts (2016). Robert Recorde: Tudor Scholar and Mathematician (University of Wales Press).
 Frank J. Swetz and Victor J. Katz (2011). "Mathematical Treasures - Robert Recorde's Whetstone of Witte," Convergence (January 2011)

External links

St. Andrew's University Maths History biography
Robert Recorde: the Welshman who invented equality
Robert Recorde and other Welsh Mathematicians
100 Welsh Heroes – Robert Recorde
Earliest Uses of Symbols of Relation
Earliest Known Uses of Some of the Words of Mathematics This contains numerous quotations from Recorde.
RECORDE (Robert) in Charles Hutton's Mathematical and Philosophical Dictionary''
Robert Recorde's life and works on h2g2
Current publisher of Robert Recorde's books in the form of original reproductions
 
 

1510s births
1558 deaths
People from Tenby
Welsh scientists
Welsh philosophers
Alumni of the University of Oxford
Alumni of the University of Cambridge
Welsh mathematicians
16th-century English mathematicians
16th-century Welsh medical doctors
Fellows of All Souls College, Oxford
People imprisoned for debt
16th-century Welsh scientists
16th-century philosophers
16th-century Welsh writers
16th-century male writers